Wyssogota is a Polish coat of arms. It was used by several szlachta families in the times of the Kingdom of Poland and the Polish–Lithuanian Commonwealth.

History

Blazon

Notable bearers
Notable bearers of this coat of arms include:
 Ignacy Wyssogota Zakrzewski (1745–1805), Polish politician, MP and president of Warsaw in the times of Kościuszko's Uprising

Bibliography
 Andrzej Kulikowski: Wielki herbarz rodów polskich. Warszawa: Świat Książki, 2005, .

See also
 Polish heraldry
 Heraldry
 Coat of arms

Wyssogota